Eulogio Balao (March 11, 1907 – August 22, 1977) was a Filipino soldier and politician.

Career
Balao joined the Philippine Constabulary as a young man and rose through its ranks. During World War II, he served in the U.S. Army Forces Far East. As a Major, Balao served as Donald Blackburn's Inspector General for his guerrilla force.  As a commanding officer, he led 11th Infantry Battalion troops to a victorious engagement during the Battle of Bessang Pass against the Japanese troops of General Tomoyuki Yamashita. Following the war, Balao, then a Colonel, turned his military efforts towards quelling the Hukbalahap forces of the Communist Party of the Philippines in Luzon. Thereafter, in 1949, Balao was assigned to service in Nanking, China as the Philippines' Military Attaché. In 1953, he became a brigadier general and in 1954 was appointed Vice Chief of Staff before, in 1956, assuming the office of Secretary of National Defense. Balao served in that capacity from January 3, 1956 to August 28, 1957. In 1957, he was elected to the Senate of the Philippines, where he remained until 1963.

Balao received a number of awards and honors throughout his career, including the Distinguished Service Star and induction into the Philippine Legion of Honor, where he was bestowed the rank of Commander.

Balao, who was closely identified with President Ferdinand Marcos, died in 1977.

Personal life
The son of Matias Balao and Praxedes Baluitan, Balao graduated high school in his hometown of Tuguegarao, Cagayan, in 1926. He graduated the Philippine Constabulary Academy in 1931 and in 1936 attended Officer School in Fort Benning, Georgia. He had five children, Praxedes, Juliana, Eulogio Jr., Ramon, and Antoinette

References
Eulogio B. Balao, Department of National Defense, Philippines.
 Eulogio Balao, Senate of the Philippines.

1907 births
1977 deaths
Philippine Military Academy alumni
People from Tuguegarao
Politicians from Cagayan
Secretaries of National Defense of the Philippines
Senators of the 4th Congress of the Philippines
Senators of the 5th Congress of the Philippines
Recipients of the Distinguished Service Star
Recipients of the Philippine Legion of Honor
Philippine Army generals
Garcia administration cabinet members
Magsaysay administration cabinet members